Vincent Elbaz (born 3 February 1971) is a French actor. He has appeared in many French television shows and films.

His first major role was in the 1994 film Le péril jeune. Elbaz received the 1998 Jean Gabin Prize.

Elbaz was born in Paris to a Moroccan Jewish family. He is married to Fanny Conquy, with whom he has two children.

Filmography
 1994 : Le Péril jeune, by Cédric Klapisch
 1995 : Le Plus bel âge..., by Didier Haudepin
 1996 : Enfants de salaud, by Tonie Marshall
 1996 : Je m'appelle Régine, by Pierre Aknine (TV)
 1997 : Just Do It, by Frédéric Chèze & Denis Thybaud (Short Film)
 1997 : Les Randonneurs, by Philippe Harel
 1997 : La Vérité si je mens !, by Thomas Gilou
 1997 : Petits Désordres amoureux, by Olivier Péray
 1998 : Grève party, by Fabien Onteniente
 1999 : Suzy vend des sushis, by Delphine Quentin (Short Film)
 1999 : Quasimodo d'El Paris, by Patrick Timsit
 1999 : Le Sourire du clown, by Éric Besnard
 1999 : Peut-être, by Cédric Klapisch
 1999 : Un pur moment de rock'n roll, by Manuel Boursinhac
 2000 : J'peux pas dormir..., bu Guillaume Canet (Short Film)
 2000 : Nag la bombe, by Jean-Louis Milesi
 2000 : Mémoire morte, by Jean-Jacques Dumonceau (Short Film)
 2000 : La Parenthèse enchantée, by Michel Spinosa
 2001 : Absolument fabuleux, by Gabriel Aghion
 2002 : Rue des plaisirs, by Patrice Leconte
 2002 : Embrassez qui vous voudrez, by Michel Blanc
 2002 : Un monde presque paisible, by Michel Deville
 2003 : Not For, or Against (Quite the Contrary), by Cédric Klapisch
 2005 : D'Artagnan et les trois mousquetaires, by Pierre Aknine
 2005 : Test, by Didier Rouget (Short Film)
 2005 : Dans tes rêves, by Denis Thybaud
 2005 : Ma vie en l'air, by Rémi Bezançon
 2005 : The Perfume of the Lady in Black, by Bruno Podalydès
 2007 : Tel père telle fille by Olivier de Plas
 2007 : Les Buttes Chaumont by Ariel Zeitoun
 2007 : J'aurais voulu être un danseur by Alain Berliner
 2007 : Le Dernier gang by Ariel Zeitoun
 2008 : Les Randonneurs à Saint-Tropez by Philippe Harel
 2009 : Good Canary by Patrick Czaplinski (TV)
 2009 : Sweet Valentine by Emma Luchini
 2009 : Park Benches by Bruno Podalydès
 2009 : Tellement proches by Olivier Nakache & Éric Toledano
 2010 : L'Assaut by Julien Leclercq
 2010 : Au bas de l'échelle by Arnauld Mercadier (TV)
 2010 : Comme les cinq doigts de la main by Alexandre Arcady
 2012 : La vérité si je mens! 3 by Thomas Gilou
 2014 : The Hundred-Foot Journey by Lasse Hallström
 2016 : Amis publics by Edouard Pluvieux
 2017 : Primaire by Hélène Angel
 2017 : Il a déjà tes yeux by Lucien Jean-Baptiste 
 2017 : Tout là-haut by Serge Hazanavicius
 2017 : The Trouble With You by Pierre Salvadori
 2017 : Daddy Cool by Maxime Govare
 2018 : I Am Not an Easy Man by Eleonore Pourriat
 2021 : Mystère by Denis Imbert

Television

Theatre
 2007 : Good Canary written by Zach Helm, directed by John Malkovich
 2002 : Hysteria written by Terry Johnson, directed by John Malkovich, at Théâtre Marigny in Paris
Nomination Molières 2003 : Meilleur comédien et Révélation théâtrale masculine
 1995 : COURTELINE + FEYDEAU = LA TÊTE À TOTO, directed by D. CHEKROUNE
 1995 : Gueule de nuit, directed by P. Aknine
 1994 TOURNÉE DE THÉÂTRE DE RUE (Compagnie Moctezuma Création Collective)
 1993: Le Bouc written by Rainer Werner Fassbinder,  directed by d'Antoine Scotto (Théâtre Mathis)
 1992 : La plaisante aventure written by Carlo Goldoni, directed by Antoine Scotto, Festival de la Jeunesse
 1990-1992: L'Ouest le vrai written by Sam Shepard, directed by J.-Y Hadjadj (Théâtre Ecole d'Anjou)

References

External links

Vincent Elbaz Filmography at Fandango

1971 births
Living people
20th-century French Jews
French people of Moroccan-Jewish descent
French male stage actors
French male film actors
French male television actors
Cours Florent alumni
20th-century French male actors
21st-century French male actors